Anikó Szamoránsky (born 9 July 1986 in Győr) is a Hungarian handball player who currently plays for Szent István SE in the Hungarian second division handball league.

Personal
She has a twin sister, Piroska, who is also a professional handballer and plays as a line player.

Achievements

Nemzeti Bajnokság I:
Winner: 2007
Silver Medallist: 2006, 2009
Bronze Medallist: 2008, 2011
Magyar Kupa:
Silver Medallist: 2007
EHF Cup:
Winner: 2006
EHF Cup Winners' Cup:
Winner: 2011
Semifinalist: 2007
EHF Champions Trophy:
Fourth Placed: 2006

References

External links
 Anikó Szamoránsky career statistics at Worldhandball

1986 births
Living people
Hungarian female handball players
Sportspeople from Győr
Győri Audi ETO KC players